Model–test–model (MTM) is a process that intends to use high-fidelity/high-resolution combat models to simulate and replicate field operational tests. The MTM Process is divided into 5 phases:

 Long-term planning – Identify the responsibility among interested organizations
 Pretest modeling – Modeler creates a model of a subject under test
 Field test – Modeler performs data gathering of subject under test
 Post-test modeling – Subject under test model input parameters are matched with subject under test–field–test output values
 Model validation/accreditation – Modeler provides sufficient evidence to a tester that a simulation adequately replicates field testing

See also
 Simulation-based acquisition
 United States Army Test and Evaluation Command
 United States Army Materiel Systems Analysis Activity

References

Military technology
Military terminology
Military simulation